Michaela Bornemann (born 17 March 1971) is an Austrian judoka. She competed in the women's extra-lightweight event at the 1992 Summer Olympics.

References

External links
 

1971 births
Living people
Austrian female judoka
Olympic judoka of Austria
Judoka at the 1992 Summer Olympics
Sportspeople from Graz